The 2006–07 Ekstraklasa started on 28 July 2006 and finished on 26 May 2007. Zagłębie Lubin were crowned champions.

For the second time league was sponsored by cell phone operator Orange Polska and official name for championship was Orange Ekstraklasa 2006–07.

Corruption
On 12 April 2007 PZPN decided about degradation of Górnik Łęczna (two class degradation and 270,000 PLN fine) and Arka Gdynia (one class degradation and 200,000 PLN fine and minus 5 points on the start of next season) due to their involvement in corruption scandal.

Clubs

16 clubs competed in the 2006–07 season:

 Teams that finished 1–13 in 2005–06 Ekstraklasa. In alphabetical order:
 Cracovia
 Dyskobolia Grodzisk Wielkopolski
 GKS Bełchatów
 Górnik Łęczna
 Górnik Zabrze
 Korona Kielce
 Lech Poznań
 Legia Warszawa
 Odra Wodzisław Śląski
 Pogoń Szczecin
 Wisła Kraków
 Wisła Płock
 Zagłębie Lubin
 Three teams promoted from Polish Second League. In alphabetical order:
Arka Gdynia (3rd place, won playoffs)
ŁKS Łódź
Widzew Łódź

League table

Results

Top goalscorers

Annual awards
These were given out by the weekly magazine Piłka Nożna

Coach of the Year
Orest Lenczyk (GKS Bełchatów)

Discovery of the Year
Radosław Matusiak (GKS Bełchatów)

League player of the year
Piotr Reiss (Lech Poznań)

Best Foreign Players
2006:
Goalkeeper: Emilian Dolha (Wisła Kraków)
Defender (football): Edson (Legia Warszawa), Cléber (Wisła Kraków), Dickson Choto (Legia Warszawa), Veselin Đoković (Korona Kielce)
Midfielder: Roger Guerreiro (Legia Warszawa), Henry Quinteros (Lech Poznań), Hermes (Korona Kielce), Miroslav Radović (Legia Warszawa)
Striker: Ensar Arifović (ŁKS), Edi Andradina (Pogoń).

Piłka Nożna's Ekstraklasa All star team
Goalkeeper: Emilian Dolha(Wisła Kraków), Micahl Vaclavik (Zagłębie Lubin)
Right Defender: Paweł Golański(Korona Kielce), Grzegorz Bartczak(Zagłębie Lubin)
Center Defender: Dickson Choto(Legia Warszawa), Dariusz Pietrasiak(GKS Bełchatów), Cléber Guedes de Lima (Wisła Kraków), Michał Stasiak(Zagłębie Lubin)
Left Defender: Manuel Arboleda(Zagłębie Lubin), Grzegorz Bronowicki(Legia Warszawa)
Right Midfield: Jakub Błaszczykowski(Wisła Kraków), Miroslav Radović(Legia Warszawa)
CenterMidfield: Maciej Iwański(Zagłębie Lubin), Tomasz Jarzębowski(GKS Bełchatów), Rafał Murawski(Lech Poznań), Dariusz Dudka(Wisła Kraków)
Left Midfield: Łukasz Garguła(GKS Bełchatów), Roger Guerreiro(Legia Warszawa)
Striker: Piotr Reiss(Lech Poznań), Adrian Sikora(Dyskobolia Grodzisk), Michał Chałbiński(Zagłębie Lubin), Łukasz Piszczek(Zagłębie Lubin).

References

Ekstraklasa seasons
Poland
1